The MV DenDen was a Dry Cargo Ship that could carry 7,000 metric tons of furnace oil. The ship capsized and sank in June 2007, with the loss of seven lives.

DenDen was owned by a company based in Eritrea. The ship carried a crew of 24 people, mostly from Pakistan. It sank on June 23, 2007 following an engine failure off the coast of Mangalore, India. The ship had been having engine problems on its voyage. It was heading for Dubai when it had to make a stop at the docks in Mangalore ports. The ship was waiting for replacement parts for its broken shaft when a strong wind pried the ship's anchor off, causing it to hit a sandbar and become stranded. Nineteen crew members swam back to shore; five drowned. The bodies of the remaining five crew members have not been recovered.

The ship was declared a total loss.

References
 https://web.archive.org/web/20071024183614/http://mumbaimirror.com/net/mmpaper.aspx?Page=article

Oil tankers
Shipwrecks in the Arabian Sea
Maritime incidents in 2007